Christian Horvath (born 7 November 1981) is an Austrian former competitive figure skater. He is a two-time national champion (1998, 2000) and placed 25th at the 2000 European Championships. His father was a soccer player.

Programs

Competitive highlights 
JGP: Junior Grand Prix

References

External links

Navigation

Austrian male single skaters
1981 births
Living people
People from Feldkirch, Vorarlberg
Sportspeople from Vorarlberg